In organic chemistry, an addition reaction is, in simplest terms, an organic reaction where two or more molecules combine to form a larger one (the adduct).
 
Addition reactions are limited to chemical compounds that have multiple bonds, such as molecules with carbon–carbon double bonds (alkenes), or with triple bonds (alkynes), and compounds that have rings, which are also considered points of unsaturation. Molecules containing carbon—hetero double bonds like carbonyl groups, or imine groups, can undergo addition, as they too have double-bond character.

An addition reaction is the reverse of an elimination reaction. For instance, the hydration of an alkene to an alcohol is reversed by dehydration. 

There are two main types of polar addition reactions: electrophilic addition and nucleophilic addition. Two non-polar addition reactions exist as well, called free-radical addition and cycloadditions.  Addition reactions are also encountered in polymerizations and called addition polymerization.  

Depending on the product structure, it could promptly react further to eject a leaving group to give the addition–elimination reaction sequence.

Addition reactions are useful in analytic chemistry, as they can identify the existence and number of double bonds in a molecule.  For example, bromine addition will consume a bromine solution, resulting in a color change: 
RR'C=CR''R''' + Br2(orange-brown) ->[{}\atop\ce{CCl4}] RR'CBr-BrCR''R'''(typically\ colorless)  Likewise hydrogen addition often proceeds on all double-bonds of a molecule, and thus gives a count of the number of a double and triple bonds through stoichiometry: {(H2C=CH)2} + 2H2 ->[{}\atop\ce{Pt}/\ce{Pd}] (H3C-CH2)2

References

 
Reaction mechanisms